Underwood School District # 550 is a school district headquartered in Underwood, Minnesota.

 Dave Kuehn is the superintendent. The entire K-12 school has a single principal, Hamann.

History
Kuehn was hired as the superintendent effective July 2, 2018. He was previously the assistant principal of Waconia High School. The decision to hire him was made in April of that year.

References

External links
 Underwood School District # 550
School districts in Minnesota